Sir Denis Fitzgerald Desmond, KCVO, CBE (born 1943) is a retired British company director and public administrator, who was Lord Lieutenant of County Londonderry from 2000 to 2018.

Desmond was born in 1943, the son of an army officer. He served as an officer in the Territorial Army from 1964 to 1969, for the two years as aide-de-camp to Governor of Northern Ireland. In 1970, he became chairman of Desmond and Sons Ltd, his family's clothing business; he stepped down as chairman in 2005. He also sat on the board of Ulster Bank in the 1990s and was council member for The Prince's Trust Northern Ireland between 2008 and 2012.

In the public sphere, Desmond was High Sheriff of County Londonderry in 1974, and appointed a deputy lieutenant in 1992, eight years before he became lord lieutenant.

He was appointed a Commander of the Order of the British Empire in 1989 and a Knight Commander of the Royal Victorian Order in 2018 (on his retirement as lord lieutenant). He has received honorary doctorates from the Queen's University Belfast and the Ulster University, and in 2018 received the Freedom of the Borough of Causeway Coast and Glens.

Denis Desmond liquidated Desmond & Co in 2004, thus depriving hundreds of employees their pension that they had contributed to, some for over 45 years. Eventually the UK government introduced the pensions act to redress the loses of his former employees and prevent any company adopting this approach on the future. Denis Desmond’s wealth was recently estimated to be worth £127 million.

References 

Living people
1943 births
Knights Commander of the Royal Victorian Order
Commanders of the Order of the British Empire
Businesspeople from Northern Ireland